is a district in Fukui Prefecture, Japan.

Towns and villages
The district has one town:

 Echizen

History

Recent mergers
 On February 1, 2005 - The towns of Asahi and Ota, and the village of Miyazaki were merged into the expanded town of Echizen.
 On February 1, 2006 - The town of Shimizu and the village of Koshino, along with the town of Miyama (from Asuwa District), were merged into the expanded city of Fukui.

Districts in Fukui Prefecture